Jean-Marie Raymond  (born 1949) is a French classical guitarist, composer, conductor and teacher.

Life 
Guitarist, composer, teacher and conductor, Raymond studied music at the École normale de musique de Paris with Alberto Ponce and Javier Hinojosa. He was also a student of the world-renowned master Emilio Pujol. He studied musical composition with Yvonne Desportes and conducting with Désiré Dondeyne, both Grand prix de Rome. First Prize in classical guitar, he also obtained the State Diploma and the Certificate of Aptitude. 

In 1977, he played as a soloist under the direction of Seiji Ozawa with the Orchestre de Paris. He produced a recording ("Four-handed Guitar" now "Kizuna" in its expanded reissue) with his long-time friend, the Japanese guitarist Minoru Inagaki. He performs internationally as a soloist and with the Trio Sortilèges (flûte, guitar, cello). In 1999, with Thierry Frebourg, CEO of Studio Press (Roularta Media Group), he founded the  magazine which occupies a major place in the landscape of the specialized press for the guitar.

A large portion of his compositions is published by Productions d'Oz, Quebec.

Discography 
 "KIZUNA": Solos and classical guitar duets with Japanese guitarist Minoru Inagaki.
 "AQUARELLES": Classical guitar solos. Works from the repertoire and personal compositions.

Composer 
His best-known compositions, when no publisher is indicated, are published at Productions d'Oz.

 Allégorie en forme de valse - ed. Alphonse Leduc.
 As always (homage to Per-Olov Kindgren)
 Ballad for a Friend (homage to Akira Asada)
 Canto bajo la Luna
 Chanson d'Elfée
 Comme une pavane - ed. Alphonse Leduc.
 Complainte
 Cuando me vuelvo en el camino
 Dans la brume
 Deux aquarelles
 El azul de tus ojos
 Souvenirs d'Algarve
 Élégie
 Evocation nostalgique (homage to Nobutaka Nakajima)
 Incantation magique
 Jardin secret
 Juanito, el guitarrero (homage to Jun Nakano)
 Kizuna (homage to Minoru Inagaki)
 Kobe in my heart (homage to Nobuko Tanaka)
 La Cité d'Emeraude (homage to Sylvain Lemay)
 Ma fille (homage to Oriane Bellini)
 Memories of Tateshina
 Night Song
 Paysage catalan
 Poema nostalgico
 Pour un reflet dans l’eau
 Rising Sun
 Sakura's Flowers
 Santa Ana Cruz
 Snow in my heart
 Snow Sonata
 Somewhere Under the Rainbow
 Storybook
 Song for Johanna
 Sous le ciel d'Akashi (homage to Minoru Inagaki)
 Suite des Constellations
 Andromède
 Orion
 Cassiopée
 Souvenirs de Cervera - ed. Alphonse Leduc.
 Sweet Bonnie Dickinson
 Three friends in Kyoto
 Un Jour de septembre

He has also composed many pieces for various instrumental ensembles such as:  
 À la lumière de l'aube (duo)
 Alter Ego  (duo) (homage to Minoru Inagaki)
 As the Seasons Go By (quartet)
 Au loin vers le sud (duo) - ed. Alphonse Leduc.
 Géralda (duo) - ed. Alphonse Leduc.
 Mélancolie for guitar quartet
 Quant au matin tu t'éveilles (trio)
 A Rainbow for Minoru (duo) (homage to Nobuko Tanaka and Nobutaka Nakajima)
 Sous le ciel d'Akashi (in solo form, on the one hand, and quintet, on the other) (homage to Minoru Inagaki). 
 Twilight Serenade (guitars and string quartet)

References

External links 
 Personal website
 Un jour de septembre, composed and interpreted by Jean Marie Raymond (YouTube)

1949 births
20th-century French male musicians
20th-century French musicians
21st-century French male musicians
21st-century French musicians
Composers for the classical guitar
École Normale de Musique de Paris alumni
French classical guitarists
French male guitarists
French music educators
Living people